The Botanic Garden of the Jagiellonian University is a botanical garden, founded in 1783 in Kraków. It is located east of the Old Town (Stare Miasto) and occupies 9.6 hectares. It belongs to the Jagiellonian University and is classified as a historical location.

Location 

The Botanical Garden is located east of the Kraków Old Town, in the II Grzegorzki District (formerly in the Wesoła District), at Copernicus Str. 27.

History 

Botany was taught to medical students at the Jagiellonian University from the end of the sixteenth century. However, the school did not have a test garden. The university rector, Dr. Casimir Stepkowskiego, writing in 1756, provided five thousand PLN for preliminary work to create a garden. The garden itself was founded in 1783 and is the oldest remaining in Poland. [1]

Kraków Botanical Garden was in place family Czartoryski, purchased in 1752 by the Jesuits. [2] [3] After the dissolution of the Order, it was transferred to the Commission of National Education, which is part of the reform of the Kraków Academy established a botanical garden as an auxiliary unit of the Faculty of Chemistry and Natural History. The area covers about 2.4 hectares initially designed as a French baroque park within which decorated collection of medicinal plants and ornamentals. Organization garden dealt with John Jaskiewicz (1749–1809). In 1783, preparatory work began. The first greenhouse was erected in 1787.

The area covered by the garden area has expanded several times. The garden acquired its current area in the 1950s.

Buildings 
The earliest greenhouse complex "Victoria", part of which is with the oldest glasshouse was rebuilt in the nineteenth and twentieth centuries, and was again reconstructed in 1993–1998. In 1882, the existing palm house was built until 1969. The "Jubilee" palm house was opened in 1966 alongside a group of tropical greenhouses. In 1954 came "Dutch" - low emissions, which covers collections of orchids. [4]

In 1788–1792 was built edifice observatory (rebuilt in 1858–1859). The observatory has worked Jan Śniadecki, famous Kraków mathematician and astronomer, and astronomer Tadeusz Banachiewicz . Today, the building known as the Collegium Śniadeckiego houses the Institute of Botany. In 1792, a garden was one of the oldest meteorological stations in Polish. It has a continuous series of measurements from 1825. Originally the site was stretched Jurydyka Cheerful, founded in 1639 by Catherine Zamoyska that she just gave it the name. You probably already in the Renaissance there was there a vast suburban property with a small palace of "Suburban villa". Residence surrounded by geometric, quartered park in the southern part of the canal ran from the old oxbow lakes. Princes Czartoryski made her one of the most beautiful palaces near Kraków. Reconstruction of the building for the Observatory was designed by the architect of Warsaw Stanislaw Zawadzki, and watched over its implementation Feliks Radwanski . Construction got on the roof of the dome observation ("postrzegalnie"), and high rooms on the ground floor was used as the Botanical Gardens (including its directors lived there). In 1829-1833 on the right side of the palace gardener's house was rebuilt into a garden office. Located on the left side of the former court stables converted into apartments and the garden for the service. Another reconstruction took place in 1859, when the former palace was formed in the style of classicism. From near the palace of April 1, 1784, he took a famous flight of the balloon, organized by J. Śniadeckiego and J. Jaskiewicz [5] [6] .

Collections 

Since the mid-nineteenth century, mainly because of botanist Joseph Warszewicz (1812–1866) travel to the Central and South America, it begins to be developed collection of plants and orchids. Today it is the oldest and largest collection of its kind in Poland, with about 500 species.

State collection was changing depending on the political situation of the country and the development of science in the Jagiellonian University. At the end of the eighteenth century in the garden, there were about three thousand plant species, especially useful. Collection of plants declined in the early nineteenth century, and it was only in the 1820s under the direction of Luigi Estreicher (1786–1852) that it was rebuilt. The garden gained particular fame in the 1860s, at the time of Ignatius Raphael Czerwiakowski (1808–1882) [7]. Stock declined in the late nineteenth century, and only Marian Raciborski (1863–1917), explorer of the Polish flora and Java began its restoration in the early twentieth century (founded a new rock garden, the department of genetics and plant variability). Its present appearance owes garden Szafer Władysław (1886–1970), one of the Polish botanists. Since 1991 he is the director Bogdan Zemanek, for which management was carried out repairs greenhouses, boilers, College Śniadeckiego and side buildings.

In 1976, the Botanical Garden was listed as a monument, as a valuable natural monument, a monument to the history of science, art, gardening and culture.

On 26 May 1983, during the celebrations of the 200th anniversary jubilee of the Botanical Garden, opened a permanent exhibition written by Alicia Zemanek and George Świecimskiego artistic project. In 1983, he established a nationwide Botany Section of the History of Polish Botanical Society, with its registered office and research program coupled with the activities of the museum.

Departments and plant collections 

Currently the plant collection contains approximately 5000 species and varieties from around the world. This total includes nearly 1,000 species of trees and shrubs, and more than 2,000 species and varieties of plants in greenhouses.

The Arboretum, which is part of the Gardens, contains as focused collection of trees and shrubs and covers the single largest area of the gardens. Partially composed as a park, and partly as a thematic groups - geographic or decorative. A collection of woody plants, there are about 1,000 species and varieties, the most valuable group of maples and oaks it [8] . Among the many beautiful and excellent plant reigns with about 230 years, " Jagiellonian Oak "- oak Quercus robur [9] .

The area of the Botanical Garden is divided into several sections:
   
 Collections of tropical plants - Greenhouses
Victoria - the name comes from the Royal Victoria Lily Victoria amazonica growing in the pool
Jubilee - built to commemorate the 600th anniversary of the Jagiellonian University in 1964
Dutch - the name is the type of greenhouse 
 Plants Ground
Plants of the Bible
Arboretum
The systematics of plants
Plant Biology
Plants protected
Rock Garden
Medicinal plants and other utility
Ornamentals
Aquatic plants

Directors, managers and distinguished staff 

 John Jaskiewicz (1749-1809) - Polish chemist, geologist and mineralogist, the first director
 Francis Scheidt (1759-1807) - botanist and physician
 Suibert Schivereck Burchard (1742-1806), Joseph August Schultes (1773-1831), Baltazar Hacquet (1739-1815), Joseph August Rhodius - Austrian and German professors
 1809 - Luigi Estreicher Raphael (1786-1852) - Polish botanist and entomologist
 Ignatius Czerwiakowski Raphael (1808-1882) - botanist, physician
 1878 - Joseph Rostafinski (1850-1928) - botanist and humanist scholar of algae and slime molds and natural history of Polish names
 Joseph Peter Brzezinski (1862-1939) - President of the Horticultural Society of Kraków, deputy director of the Botanical Garden
 Emil Godlewski senior (1847-1930) - Polish pioneer of plant physiology
 Edward Janczewski-Glinka (1846-1918) - anatomist and taxonomist
 1912-1917 - Marian RACIBORSKI (1863-1917) - botanist, explorer flora Polish
 1918-1960 - Wladyslaw Szafer (1886-1970)
    William Herter - served as director during the occupation
 1960-1965 - Bogumil Pawlowski (1898-1971) - an expert in European mountain vegetation
 1965-1967 - Bronislaw Saffron (1897-1968) - researcher of bryophytes
 1967-1970 - Wanda Wróbel-Stermińska (1911-1983)
 1970-1973 - Jan Walas (1903-1991) - geographer plants and phytosociologist
 1973-1991 - Kazimierz Szczepanek - palaeobotanist, a researcher Quaternary fossil floras
 1991-2013 - Prof. Assoc. Bogdan Zemanek - Polish botanist, a specialist in plant geography, ecology and taxonomy of plants
 2013-onwards - Prof. UJ Assoc. Joseph Mitka - Polish botanist, a specialist in plant taxonomy and ecology

Opening times 

Botanical Garden is open to visitors only during the summer months, from mid-April to mid-October.

Footnotes 

    ↑ Jan Adamczewski, Kraków from A to Z,  .
    ↑ Michael Horn, Guide to the sights and culture of Kraków, Warsaw-Kraków: Oxford University Press, 1993,  .
    ↑ Ambrose Grabowski Kraków and its surroundings, Kraków, 1866
    ↑ Polish biographical dictionary, Polish Academy of Sciences, Institute of History (Polish Academy of Sciences), 1994, Volume 35
    ↑ Alice Inferno-Zemanek, exotic garden Merry, Books, 1986.
    ↑ Mark Zhukov-Karczewski, Palaces city. The former palace of the Czartoryski (Observatory), "Echo of Krakow", 123 (13184) 1990.
    ↑ Andrew Śródka, Polish scholars nineteenth and twentieth centuries: AG, in Aries, 1994
    ↑ Kazimierz Szczepanek Guide to the Botanical Garden of the Jagiellonian University in the Polish Scientific Publishers, 1985, 
    ↑ Information on the plate mounted on oak

External links

 Homepage

1783 establishments in the Polish–Lithuanian Commonwealth
Botanical gardens in Poland
Gardens in Poland
Parks in Kraków
Jagiellonian University